Campolongo sul Brenta is a town and comune in the province of Vicenza, Veneto, northern Italy. It is west of SS47 state road.

References

External links
(Google Maps)

Cities and towns in Veneto